This article provides details of international football games played by the Panama national football team from 2020 to present.

Results

2020

2021

2022

2023

Forthcoming fixtures
The following matches are scheduled:

Head to head records

Notes

References

Football in Panama
Panama national football team
2020s in Panamanian sport